Desert Passage is a 1952 Western film starring Tim Holt. It was the last of 46 westerns Holt made for RKO.

Plot
Tim Holt and old sidekick Chito Rafferty are considering getting out of the stagecoach business when they encounter John Carver, a prison parolee who supposedly has a stash of stolen loot hidden away. Everyone else they encounter is after the money, too.

Cast
 Tim Holt as Holt
 Richard Martin as Rafferty
 Walter Reed as Carver
 John Dehner as Bronson
 Joan Dixon as Emily
 Dorothy Patrick as Roxie
 Denver Pyle as Allen
 Clayton Moore as Warwick

Reception
The film recorded a loss of $30,000. Since Holt's movies had been losing money regularly over the past few years, it was decided to stop the series.

References

External list
 
 
 
 

1952 films
American Western (genre) films
RKO Pictures films
1952 Western (genre) films
American black-and-white films
1950s English-language films
Films directed by Lesley Selander
1950s American films